Ķiģelis (feminine: Ķiģele) is a Latvian masculine surname. It may refer to:

Fēlikss Ķiģelis, Latvian rock musician
Ēriks Ķiģelis, Latvian rock musician, founder of hard rock band Līvi (:lv:Ēriks Ķiģelis)

Latvian-language masculine surnames